Itsukaichi Community Broadcast (FM Nanami) was a Japanese community FM radio station in Saeki-ku, Hiroshima.

The station was founded on November 7, 2003 and went on the air on April 18, 2004.

The station stopped broadcasting on December 1, 2007 and closed on March 31, 2008.

Mass media in Hiroshima
Radio in Japan
Radio stations established in 2003
Radio stations disestablished in 2008
Defunct radio stations in Japan